Patrick Ah Van (born 17 March 1988) is a Samoa international rugby league footballer who plays as a er for the Oldham RLFC in RFL League 1.

He previously played for the New Zealand Warriors in the NRL, and for the Bradford Bulls and the Widnes Vikings in the Super League. Ah Van also spent time on loan from Widnes at North Wales in the third tier. He also had another spell with the Vikings in the Betfred Championship and played for Villeghailhenc-Aragon XIII in the Elite 2 Championship.

Early life
Ah Van was born in Auckland, New Zealand. He is of Samoan and Chinese descent. His brothers Tom and Ralph are also rugby league players with Tom previously playing for the Warriors Under 20s, and Ralph an ex Vulcans player.

Educated at Kelston Boys' High School, Ah Van played for New Lynn Stags and Te Atatu Roosters in the Auckland Rugby League competition before playing for the Mount Albert Lions in the Bartercard Cup.

Club career

New Zealand Warriors
Ah Van made his début for the New Zealand Warriors in 2006 against the Manly-Warringah Sea Eagles. He went on to play in fifty four games for the club. In 2007 he also played for the Auckland Lions in the NSWRL Premier League, and he played for the Auckland Vulcans in the 2009 and 2010 NSW Cup competitions. In 2008, his third year at the club, Ah Van was still young enough to be eligible for the Toyota Cup team, and made thirteen appearances for the Junior Warriors, scoring six tries.

Bradford
It was announced on 31 August 2010 that Ah Van had been released from the last year of his Warriors contract so he could sign a one-year deal with Bradford for the 2011 season.

2011 - 2011 Season

Ah Van appeared in three of the four pre-season games. He played against Halifax, Dewsbury Rams and Wakefield Trinity. He scored against Halifax (6 goals), Dewsbury (1 try, 7 goals) and Wakefield Trinity (2 tries, 4 goals).

Ah Van featured in all the games that season except for Round 10 against Salford, he scored 12 tries and kicked 97 goals for a total of 242 points.

Widnes
It was announced on 2 August 2011 that Ah Van had signed a two-year contract with Widnes for the 2012 and 2013 seasons.

2012

Ah Van appeared in all three of Widnes' friendlies. He played against Warrington, Swinton and St. Helens. He scored against Warrington (3 goals), Swinton (1 goal) and St Helens (2 goals).

Ah Van featured in five consecutive games from Round 1 (Wakefield Trinity) to Round 5 (Hull Kingston Rovers). He also featured in three consecutive games from Round 10 Warrington to Round 12 (St. Helens). He featured in ten consecutive games from Round 14 (Catalans Dragons) to Round 24 (Leeds). He also appeared on the wing in the 40-38 Challenge Cup loss to St. Helens. He has scored 132 points this season, (16 tries, 34 goals).

2013

He missed Rounds 1-4 due to an injury. He featured in Round 5 (Hull) to Round 9 (Warrington). Ah Van was injured for Round 10-11. He featured in Round 12 (Castleford Tigers) to Round 13 (Wakefield Trinity). He was injured for Round 14-17. He returned to Round 18 (Wigan Warriors) to Round 27 (Salford). He also played in the Challenge Cup against Doncaster and Wigan Warriors. He has scored 116 points this season, (18 tries, 22 goals).

2014

He missed Rounds 1-5 due to injury. He featured in Round 6 (Hull F.C.) to Round 7 (Bradford). He scored 10 points this season, (2 tries, 1 goal).
(For 2014 Super League season highlights, stats and results click on 2014 Super League season results)

Villeghailhenc-Aragon XIII
He joined French club Villegailhenc-Aragon for the 2018-19 season.

Sale FC
In 2019-20, Ah Van played four games for rugby union club Sale FC.

Villeghailhenc-Aragon XIII (re-join)
On 12 October 2020 it was reported that he had re-signed for Villeghailhenc-Aragon XIII in the Elite Two Championship

North Wales Crusaders
On 11 April 2021 it was reported that he had signed for the North Wales Crusaders in RFL League 1.
Since he signed for the Welsh club in 2021, he's helped them get them 3rd place in successive seasons.
He also helped them in a very good cup run playing against Hunslet R.L.F.C., played at Caldy RUFC, with a injury and helped the side.

Oldham RLFC
On 15 October 2022 it was reported that he had signed for the Oldham RLFC in RFL League 1.

International career
Ah Van was a New Zealand representative from an early age. In 2002 and 2003 he made the New Zealand Under-16 side while in 2005 he played for both the Junior Kiwis and New Zealand Residents sides. He captained the Junior Kiwis in 2007.

In 2006 he was named in the New Zealand national rugby league team training squad for the 2006 Rugby League Tri-Nations but had to withdraw due to injury.

He was named in the Samoa training squad for the 2008 Rugby League World Cup but chose not to represent Samoa and was not selected in the final squad.

In 2009 he was named as part of the Samoan side for the Pacific Cup.

Career statistics

References

External links
Widnes Vikings profile

1988 births
Living people
Auckland rugby league team players
Bradford Bulls players
Junior Kiwis players
Mount Albert Lions players
New Lynn Stags players
New Zealand people of Chinese descent
New Zealand sportspeople of Samoan descent
New Zealand expatriate sportspeople in England
New Zealand rugby league players
New Zealand Warriors players
North Wales Crusaders players
Oldham R.L.F.C. players
People educated at Kelston Boys' High School
Rugby league centres
Rugby league fullbacks
Rugby league players from Auckland
Rugby league wingers
Rugby union players from Auckland
Sale Sharks players
Samoa national rugby league team players
Samoan people of Chinese descent
Te Atatu Roosters players
Villegailhenc Aragon XIII players
Widnes Vikings players